Oskar Lindberg may refer to:

 Oskar Lindberg (composer) (1887–1955), Swedish composer and church musician in Stockholm
 Oskar Lindberg (cross-country skier) (1894–1977), winner of Vasaloppet ski race in 1923

See also
 Oscar Lindberg (disambiguation)